Schöneiche is a municipality in the Oder-Spree District of Brandenburg, Germany. It is situated directly at the edge to Berlin/Friedrichshagen and next to Rüdersdorf and Woltersdorf, Brandenburg on the eastern edge of the German capital Berlin.

It is served by the Schöneiche bei Berlin tramway which runs from Rüdersdorf to Berlin-Friedrichshagen station on the Berlin S-Bahn network.

Demography

Notable people
Georg Luger (1849–1923), designer of the famous Luger pistol
Max Fechner (1892–1973), politician (SPD / SED), 1924–1933 Deputy of the Prussian Landtag, 1949–1953 Minister of Justice of the GDR
Margarete Herzberg (1921–2007), operatic mezzosoprano
'Ottokar Domma (1924–2007), journalist and writer
Heinz Schröder (1928–2009), puppet player (Pittiplatsch and Schnatterinchen, Mr. Fuchs and Mrs. Elster)
Waltraud Kretzschmar (1948–2018), handball player
Frank Terletzki (born 1950), footballer
Bernhard Hochwald (born 1957), olympic shooter
Frank Pastor (born 1957), footballer
Lisa Buckwitz (born 1994),  bobsledder, olympic gold medalist 2018

Gallery

References

External links

Localities in Oder-Spree